is a former Japanese football player. He used his name "大場 賢治" until April 1994.

Playing career
Oba was born in Kanagawa Prefecture on August 14, 1967. After graduating from high school, he joined Japan Soccer League club Nissan Motors in 1986. However he could not play at all in the game. He moved to Sumitomo Metal (later Kashima Antlers) in 1991. He played many matches. In 1992, Japan Soccer League was folded and founded new league J1 League. The club won the 2nd place 1993 J1 League and 1993 Emperor's Cup. He moved to newly promoted to J1 League club, Kashiwa Reysol in 1995. Although he played many matches in 1995, his opportunity to play decreased in 1996. In 1997, he moved to Japan Football League club Kawasaki Frontale. He lost opportunity to play in 1998 and retired end of 1998 season.

Club statistics

References

External links

1967 births
Living people
Association football people from Kanagawa Prefecture
Japanese footballers
Japan Soccer League players
J1 League players
Japan Football League (1992–1998) players
Yokohama F. Marinos players
Kashima Antlers players
Kashiwa Reysol players
Kawasaki Frontale players
Association football defenders